Noble Jones (1702 – November 2, 1775), an English-born carpenter, was one of the first settlers of the Province of Georgia and one of its leading officials. He was born in Herefordshire. As part of Gen. James Edward Oglethorpe's 42nd (old) Regiment of Foot, he commanded Georgia's Northern Company of Marines during the War of Jenkins' Ear (1739–48). He was the father of Noble Wimberly Jones, a physician, Speaker of the Georgia House of Representatives, and prominent leader of the Georgia patriots during the American Revolution.

Noble Jones established the Wormsloe Plantation eight miles from Savannah in the late 1730s.  Most of the plantation is now open to the public as a state historic site.

See also
History of Augusta, Georgia

References
Ebel, Carol S. "Jones, Noble". American National Biography, February 2000.

1702 births
1775 deaths
People of Georgia (British colony)
People from Herefordshire
English people of Welsh descent
English emigrants
American slave owners